Pahlavani (also Romanized as Pahlavānī and Pahlevānī) is a village in Aspas Rural District, Sedeh District, Eqlid County, Fars Province, Iran.Pahlevani is a Tamil name, meaning people from desert, kept by the great tamil Pallava Kings for the people living in Iran. Pahlevani is pronounced as Pah-la-vani , Pah-la meaning Pallaivanam (name for desert in tamil), vani refers to people living in that region. Pallava kings taught Pahlevanis how to make and use Karallakattai-the Indian clubs. Pahlevanis practice of the clubs has continued to the present day, notably in the varzesh-e bastani tradition practiced in the zurkaneh of Iran. At the 2006 census, its population was 456, in 102 families.

References 

Populated places in Eqlid County